Yuliya Drishlyuk (née Bondareva, born 3 January 1975 in Pavlodar, Kazakh SSR, Soviet Union) is a female Kazakhstani sports shooter.

References
 ISSF
 sports-reference.com

External links
 

1975 births
Living people
People from Pavlodar
Kazakhstani female sport shooters
Shooters at the 1996 Summer Olympics
Shooters at the 2000 Summer Olympics
Asian Games medalists in shooting
Shooters at the 1998 Asian Games
Shooters at the 2002 Asian Games
Shooters at the 2006 Asian Games
Shooters at the 2010 Asian Games
Shooters at the 2014 Asian Games
Asian Games gold medalists for Kazakhstan
Asian Games silver medalists for Kazakhstan
Asian Games bronze medalists for Kazakhstan
Medalists at the 1998 Asian Games
Medalists at the 2002 Asian Games
Medalists at the 2010 Asian Games
Olympic shooters of Kazakhstan
Kazakhstani people of Russian descent
20th-century Kazakhstani women
21st-century Kazakhstani women